Jean Monnet (Condrieu, Rhône 7 September 1703 - Paris, 1785) was a French theatre impresario and writer.

Life
A baker's son, he was orphaned at age 8 and taken in by his uncle before moving into the service of the duchesse de Berry at age 15. He was the director of the Opéra-Comique at the Foire Saint-Laurent from 1743 to 1745 and from 1751 to 1757.

Works
Supplément au Roman comique, ou Mémoires pour servir à la vie de Jean Monnet, ci-devant Directeur de l'Opéra-Comique à Paris, de l'Opéra de Lyon, & d'une Comédie Françoise à Londres, London, 1772, 2 vol. These were his memoirs, which are very instructive on 18th century theatre life. It was republished by Henri d'Alméras with an introduction and notes in 1908.
 Les Soupers de Daphné et les dortoirs de Lacédémone, novel, Oxford (Paris), 1740
 Le Chirurgien anglais, 'comédie-parade', with Charles Collé, 1748
 Anthologie françoise, ou Chansons choisies, depuis le 13e siècle jusqu'à présent, Paris, 1765.

External links 
 Mémoires de Jean Monnet, Directeur du Théâtre de la Foire, edited by Henri d'Alméras. Paris: Louis-Michaud, [1908]. Copies 1 and 2 at the Internet Archive.
 Jean Monnet on CÉSAR

1703 births
1785 deaths
People from Condrieu
18th-century French dramatists and playwrights
18th-century French novelists
Music historians
French autobiographers